In Greek mythology, Borysthenis may refer to two distinct individuals: 

 Borysthenes, one of the three Muses that were daughters of Apollo. Her sisters were Apollonis and Cephisso.
 Borysthenis, daughter of Borysthenes, god of the Dneper River in Scythia (modern Ukraine) who mothered Targitaos by Zeus.

Notes

Reference 

 Herodotus, The Histories with an English translation by A. D. Godley. Cambridge. Harvard University Press. 1920. . Online version at the Topos Text Project. Greek text available at Perseus Digital Library.

Greek Muses
Children of Apollo
Naiads